Toronto is the capital of Ontario and the largest city in Canada.

Toronto may also refer to:

Places

Canada
 Toronto Islands, a chain of small islands in Lake Ontario
 Toronto Township, Ontario, a former township
 Toronto Gore Township, Ontario, a former township
 Toronto, Prince Edward Island, an unincorporated area

United States
 Toronto, Illinois, a former unincorporated community
 Toronto, Indiana, an extinct town
 Toronto, Iowa, a town
 Toronto, Kansas, a city
 Toronto, Missouri an unincorporated community
 Toronto, Ohio a city
 Toronto, South Dakota a town

Elsewhere
 Toronto, New South Wales, Australia, a suburb within the city of Lake Macquarie
 Toronto, County Durham, England, a village
 Toronto Lake (disambiguation), various lakes
 2104 Toronto, an asteroid

Sports
 Toronto Argonauts, Canadian (gridiron) Football League
 Toronto Blue Jays, Major League Baseball
 Toronto Maple Leafs, National Hockey League
 Toronto Raptors, National Basketball Association
 Toronto FC, Major League Soccer
 Toronto Rock, post-1987 National Lacrosse League
 Toronto Tomahawks, 1974–1975 National Lacrosse League
 Toronto Wolfpack, professional rugby

Vessels
 HMCS Toronto, various Canadian Armed Forces ships
 HMS Toronto, various British Royal Navy ships
 a fictional interstellar vessel in the video game Albion

Other uses
 Toronto (band), a 1980s rock band 
 Toronto (cocktail), a whisky cocktail
 Toronto, Ipswich, a heritage-listed house in Ipswich, Queensland, Australia
 Joseph Toronto (1818–1893), Italian-born Mormon

See also
 
 Toronto space, in topology
 Taranto
 Tronto